Oxystegus is a genus of mosses belonging to the family Pottiaceae.

The genus has cosmopolitan distribution.

Species:
 Oxystegus circinatus (Besch.) Hilp.
 Oxystegus cylindricus (Brid.) Hilp.

References

Pottiaceae
Moss genera